Louis Victor Dubois (4 December 1837 – 12 November 1914) was a French politician.

Life

Louis Victor Dubois was born on 4 December 1837 in Dreux, Eure-et-Loir, son of wine merchant.
On 1 January 1861 he succeeded his father in the business, which he practiced until 1 July 1891.
In 1868 he was appointed a deputy judge in the Commercial Court.
He was elected to the municipal council in 1870.
He was made a judge at the Commercial Court in 1872.
In 1877 he became a councilor of the arrondissement of Dreux, and on 31 January 1878 he became mayor of Dreux. He held this office for ten years.
He was elected Councillor General of Eure-et-Loir on 6 October 1895.

Dubois ran successfully for election as deputy for Dreux on 3 November 1895 after the death of the incumbent, Jean Terrier, former Minister of Commerce and Industry. He joined the Progressive group.
He was reelected in the general elections of 8 May 1898.
He was defeated in the general elections of April–May 1902, and did not run for election again.
Louis Dubois died on 12 November 1914 in Dreux.

Notes

Sources

People from Dreux
1837 births
1914 deaths
Mayors of places in Centre-Val de Loire